Metallostichodes bicolorella is a species of snout moth. It is found in France and Turkey.

References

External links
lepiforum.de

Moths described in 1864
Phycitini
Moths of Europe